Italy selected their first Junior Eurovision Song Contest 2014 entry through an internal selection. On 4 September 2014 it was revealed that Vincenzo Cantiello would represent Italy with the song "Tu primo grande amore".

Internal selection
Shortly after the Junior Eurovision Song Contest 2013, the Italian broadcaster RAI revealed that they were interested in participating in the 2014 contest and attended a workshop for interested broadcasters. On 8 July 2014, it was announced that Italy would in fact make their debut in the 2014 contest. Two months later on 4 September 2014, the broadcaster revealed that Vincenzo Cantiello had been internally selected to represent the country with the song "Tu primo grande amore" in Marsa, Malta.

At Junior Eurovision 
At the running order draw which took place on 9 November 2014, Italy were drawn to perform eleventh on 15 November 2014, following  and preceding .

Voting

Detailed voting results
The following members comprised the Italian jury:
 Dario Salvatori
 Barbara Mosconi
 Mariolina Simone
 Massimiliano Pani
 Davide Maggio

Notes

References

Junior Eurovision Song Contest
Italy
Junior Eurovision Song Contest
Junior